Pikukuh Baduy is a customary prohibition and rules that guide the activities of the Baduy people which is based on the teachings of Sunda Wiwitan. The rules are immutable; Baduy society should not change and violate the rule, because according to their belief, everything in life is already determined.

All Baduy that follows Sunda Wiwitan religion must follow their religious pillars (rukun Baduy) which contains Sunda Wiwitan beliefs such as: ngukus, ngawalu, muja ngalaksa, ngalanjak, ngapundayan, and ngareksakeun sasaka pusaka. The rules must be adhered from traditional leaders called Pu'un. Pu'un must be respected and followed because Pu'un's are descendants of the Batara.

Demographics

In Banten Province there is a vibrant community with a very simple life depend mainly on rice cultivation and regardless of with the times. is a very closed society of the influence of foreign cultures, known as Baduy society, the or the Baduy people.

This community inhabits the slopes of mountains Kendeng with an area of approximately 5101.85 hectares. Administratively located in Village Kanekes, Leuwidamar subdistrict, Lebak District, Banten Province. Range 160 km west City Metropolitan Jakarta. the name Bedouins at first not from the Baduy people's own. South Banten residents who have religious Islam, commonly called the 'baduy' to people who do not Kanekes barefoot, riding abstinence, abstinence formal school, and like move as much as anyone in the Arab.

Baduy people, both ethnically, geographically, history, language, also in their own recognition is a Sundanese. To differentiate with other Sundanese people who reside and from outside the area Baduy, they named themselves Sunda Wiwitan. the Wiwitan Sundanese term for the Baduy, understanding not only limited to ethnic or sub-ethnic, but also includes geography, history, language, culture including customs and beliefs.

Baduy population numbered 10,879 souls, 5,465 men and women's souls 5414, based on Census data Villagers Kanekes February 28, 2008. Judging from previous years, rapid population growth of 1.79% per year. As citizens of rapid growth, changes in residential land (territorial) also extends continuously evolving. In the Regional Regulation No. 23 of 2001 by position, inside and outside, shelter residents, Baduy administratively divided into two: Baduy and Outer Baduy. In a Baduy society, amounting to 1,053 souls occupy land inhabited three villages: Cikeusik, Cikertawa and Cibeo. Outer Baduy people who numbered 9,826 souls occupy land that was inhabited 57 villages and 5 scene of (splitting the village). In the previous year, 2003 Outer Baduy is known that only has 45 villages and 6 scene of.

Distribution

Baduy are divided into three groups, namely Tangtu, panamping and dangka. Nevertheless, grouping is often used by the general public only two, namely Baduy (equivalent to tangtu) and Baduy Affairs (equivalent to panamping and dangka).

Wiwitan Sundanese way of life 

Wiwitan Sundanese adheres to pikukuh and buyut, a customary rules and prohibition. Pikukuh are the rules and the way of life ancestor (karuhun) lived. This contains Baduy's religious orientation, concepts and manner. Buyut are taboo and prohibition on pikukuh. Buyut is not codified in the form of text, but instead applied as Wiwitan Sundanese interacts with each other, the environment and Sang Hyang Kersa.  Baduy's pikukuh and buyut remains unchanged, and inherited from their ancestors. Buyut and Pikukuh of the Baduy community as follows:

 (buyut were entrusted to pu'un)

 (thirty-three countries)

 (river sixty-five)

 (center of twenty-five states)

 (mountain should not be destroyed)

 (valley should not be tampered with)

 (prohibition should not be violated)

 (buyut can not be changed)

 (length can not be cut)

 (short not to be connected)

 (Another be eliminated)

 (the other must be considered another)

 (which really should be justified)

 (taking must say good-bye)

 (taking must ask)

 (To take aromatic ginger (kencur), must notify the owner)

 (To unearth ginger, must notify the owner)

 (To shake the tree so the fruit fell, must notify the owner)

 (speak wisely)

 (Think before speak so that it does not offend)

 (do not speak carelessly)

 (do not speak sloppily)

 (do not steal despite shortcomings)

 (do not fornicate and date)

,  (idiom: do not exaggerate and redact while speaking)

 (consequently)

 (could fail to be a leader)

 (can be crazy to be an aristocrat)

 (can be lost influence)

 (could be lost authority)

 (could lose a fight)

 (could lose war)

 (can be lost courage)

 (can be lost magic)
 
Baduy's Pikukuh also regulates governance of Baduy traditional institutions, which led by three Pu'un. The three top leaders are taken from three villages in the Inner Baduy: Cibeo, Cikeusik and Cikartawana. Pu'un is the key person that has karuhun ancestor, their job is to protect earth's spirit and to make sure the village member adheres and follow the Pikukuh.

In addition, Baduy has customary provisions and guidelines that must be adhered. The contents of Baduy customary prohibitions are:

 Changing the way water flow like making a fish pond or drainage is prohibited;
 Prohibited from changing the shape of the land such as wells or land leveling;
 No entry to the sacred forest (leuweung titipan) for cutting down a tree;
 Prohibited use of chemical technology;
 Prohibited plantation for farming;
 Forbidden to keep four-legged animals such as goats and buffalo;
 Indiscriminate farming is banned;
 Sloppy dressing is prohibited.

Pikukuh and buyut are orally told to all the Baduy people in every traditional ceremonies.

See also
 Agama Hindu Dharma
 Baduy people
 Kejawèn
 Sunda Wiwitan

References

Sundanese culture